The 2018 World RX of Norway was the fifth round of the fifth season of the FIA World Rallycross Championship. The event was held at the Lånkebanen near Hell, Nord-Trøndelag.

Qualifying

Semi-finals

Semi-Final 1

Semi-Final 2

Final

Standings after the event

 Note: Only the top five positions are included.

References

|- style="text-align:center"
|width="35%"|Previous race:2018 World RX of Great Britain
|width="40%"|FIA World Rallycross Championship2018 season
|width="35%"|Next race:2018 World RX of Sweden
|- style="text-align:center"
|width="35%"|Previous race:2017 World RX of Norway
|width="40%"|World RX of Norway
|width="35%"|Next race:Incumbent
|- style="text-align:center"

Norway
World RX
World RX